The Carleton Ravens  are a collegiate women's ice hockey  team based out of Ottawa, Ontario, Canada. Competing as the women's ice hockey team of Carleton University, the Ravens play in the Quebec Student Sports Federation (RSEQ), as part of the Canadian Interuniversity Sport women's ice hockey championship.  The team plays its home games at the Carleton Ice House, typically on Saturday and Sunday afternoons.

History
During the 2006-07 regular season, Valerie Charbonneau earned her second straight nod to the RSEQ All-Star Team. Recording 540 saves, she would break the previous single season record of 532, which she set one season earlier. On February 28, 2007, she would log an astounding 53 saves in a 5-4 double overtime victory versus the Ottawa Gee-Gees, resulting in the program's first-ever playoff victory.

Earning the 2011 Carleton University Most Outstanding Graduating Female Athlete Award, Kristen Marson would play 91 games, setting a program record. In addition, she would graduate as the Ravens all-time leader in career assists with 21.

In a January 22, 2012 game against the No. 1-ranked McGill Martlets, the Ravens defeated McGill for the first time in program history via a 4-3 shootout victory. McGill had won 116 of its previous 117 games entering the upset.

On February 4, 2012, the Ravens honoured the memory of the late Daron Richardson, daughter of Ottawa Senators assistant coach, Luke Richardson. The club held a charity drive for the Daron Richardson Fund (known as Do It For Daron), a program focused on raising awareness about youth mental health. Bruce MacDonald, Daron's former coach and the father of Ravens player Kristen MacDonald participated in the ceremonial face off.

On January 20, 2013, a contest at the Carleton Ice House versus the cross-town rival Ottawa Gee-Gees resulted in a shootout. Ravens forward Jessica O'Grady would record three goals in the shootout, resulting in one of the most remarkable wins in program history.

In preparation for the 2013 IIHF Women's World Championship, the Carleton Ice House served as the training facility for the Germany women's national ice hockey team. Former Ravens team captain Sara Seiler served as a member of the German squad. Of note, the Ravens hosted Germany in an exhibition game, which saw the Germans prevail by a 3-0 tally, with goals from Julia Zorn, Franziska Busch, Andrea Lanzl.

Pierre Alain era
Longtime Hockey Canada deckhand Pierre Alain was named the new head coach of the program on May 2, 2014. The coach of multiple gold medal-winning national teams, Alain promised a full rebuild of the program from the ground up, starting with recruiting.

Alain's first season in charge, 2014–15, proved to be a difficult one, as players tried to find chemistry with a strong batch of first-year recruits. Carleton sputtered to a 3-17 record, losing its final ten games in a row to slide out of playoff contention. However, an encouraging set of freshman including goaltender Katelyn Steele, defenceman Robyn Belland, and forward Sidney Weiss leave plenty of room for future optimism around the program.

Coach Alain's program began the 2015-16 campaign with a roster composed of more than 60% freshman, along with the most first-year heavy opening night lineup in Canada. Freshman Nicole Miners would lead the team in scoring with 10 points. On the final day of the season, Miners would record three assists in a winning effort versus the Ottawa Gee-Gees. Finishing the season with 10 points, she would set a program record for most points in one season by a rookie.

The following season, Miners rookie scoring record would be broken. Delaney Ross, from Meadow Lake, Saskatchewan, amassed eight goals and 10 assists for an 18 point campaign. Not only did she set a new Ravens standard for rookie skaters, she would establish a single-season scoring record, also becoming the first player in program history to average one point per game.

Over Ross' last four games, she recorded six points, on the strength of five assists. In addition, Ross' 18 points tied her with Concordia's Audrey Belzile for the second highest scoring total in U Sports play among rookies, trailing national leader Annie Berg of the Brock Badgers by five points. Earning a spot on the 2016-17 U Sports All-Rookie Team, she became only the second player in program history to receive national recognition. Coincidentally, the other Ravens player to receive national honours also landed on the All-Rookie Team, Kerri Palmer from 2007-08.

During August 2020, former Ravens player and current assistant coach Tawnya Guindon was one of 18 former U Sports student-athletes announced among the inaugural participants of the U SPORTS Female Apprenticeship Coach Program. Funded through Sport Canada, the objective was to increase the number of females in coaching positions across Canadian universities, matching apprentice coaches who have recently graduated with a mentor coach.

As the 2020-21 season was shelved due to the Covid-19 Pandemic, the charitable efforts of first-year recruit Emma Weller made national news. Handing out wool hats and mittens, that she sewed herself, to homeless communities around the nation's capital, it caught the attention of The Sports Network, who dispatched a production team to produce a feature of her efforts ahead of Bell Let’s Talk Day.

Season-by-season Record

Exhibition

|-
!colspan=12 style="  "| Exhibition
|-

Season team scoring champion

Team captains
This is an incomplete list

Sara Seiler was the first European in the history of the program to have the captaincy bestowed upon her.

2002-03: Tricia Zakaria
2003-04: Tricia Zakaria
2008-09: Tara O'Reilly
2009-10: Tara O'Reilly
2010-11: Sara Seiler
2011-12: Sara Seiler
2012-13: Blaire MacDonald 
2013-14:
2014-15: Sadie Wegner
2015-16: Tawnya Guindon
2016-17: Tawnya Guindon
2017-18: Leah Scott
2018-19: Leah Scott
2019-20: Leah Scott 
2020-21: No season held
2021-22:

Awards and honours

USports
Delaney Ross, 2017 USports All-Rookie Team

RSEQ
Erica Skinner, 2010-11 RSEQ Leadership and Citizenship Award (Nomination for the Marion Hilliard Award - presented annually to the CIS women's hockey player who best combines academic and sport excellence with community involvement) 
Kristen MacDonald, 2011-12 RSEQ Leadership and Citizenship Award (Nomination for the Marion Hilliard Award - presented annually to the CIS women's hockey player who best combines academic and sport excellence with community involvement)

RSEQ All-Stars
First-Team
Kerri Palmer, 2008 RSEQ First Team All-Star
Second-Team
Valerie Charbonneau: 2005-06 RSEQ Second Team All-Star
 Valerie Charbonneau: 2006-07 RSEQ Second Team All-Star
Kristen Marson: 2006-07 RSEQ Second Team All-Star
Kristen Marson, 2011 RSEQ Second All-Star Team
2011-12 RSEQ SECOND ALL-STAR TEAM: Melanie McKnight
2011-12 RSEQ SECOND ALL-STAR TEAM: Tamber Tisdale
2016-17 RSEQ Second Team All-Stars: Katelyn Steele, Carleton

RSEQ All-Rookie
Robyn Belland, 2014-15 RSEQ All-Rookie Team
2016-17 RSEQ All-Rookie Team: Delaney Ross
2019-20 RSEQ ALL-ROOKIE TEAM: Nicole MacNeil, Carleton

Conference weekly awards
Katelyn Steele, RSEQ Female Athlete of the Week (Awarded January 10, 2017)

Team Awards
This is an incomplete list

Most Valuable Player
2005-06: Valerie Charbonneau
2006-07: Caitlin Cadeau
2007-08: Kristen Marson
2008-09: Valerie Charbonneau
2011-12: Claudia Bergeron
2012-13: Blaire MacDonald
2013-14: Eri Kiribuchi, Goaltender
2014-15: Tawnya Guindon
2015-16: Katelyn Steele
2016-17: Katelyn Steele
2019-20: Jennifer Semkowski

Alumni Award
2005-06: Meryl Ditchburn
2006-07: Michelle Higgins
2007-08: Jessica Bradley
2013-14: Jasmine Levesque
2014-15: Ainslee Kent
2015-16: Tawnya Guindon
2016-17: Tawnya Guindon
2019-20: Jennifer Semkowski

University Awards
Kristen Marson: 2011 Carleton University Most Outstanding Graduating Female Athlete

Ravens Athlete of the Week
Kristen Marson: Carleton University’s Athlete of the Week (Week of January 18, 2011)

Ravens in professional hockey

International
 Hedda Gjerde : 2013 IIHF Women's World Championship Division I
 Eri Kiribuchi : 2009 Winter Universiade
 Andrea Kollova : 2016 IIHF World Women's U18 Championship – Division I
 Sara Seiler : 2013 IIHF Women's World Championship and Ice hockey at the 2014 Winter Olympics – Women's tournament

References

See also
 2011–12 Carleton Lady Ravens ice hockey season
 2010–11 Carleton Lady Ravens ice hockey season

External links 
 The official site of Carleton women’s hockey 

Carleton Ravens
U Sports women's ice hockey teams
Women's ice hockey teams in Canada
Ice hockey teams in Ontario
Women in Ontario